World Team Cup is a professional men's tennis tournament for nation-based teams.

World Team Cup or Team World Cup or variant, may also refer to:

 Speedway World Team Cup, a motorcycle speedway tournament for nation-based teams of pro riders
 ITF World Team Cup (wheelchair tennis), a parasport tournament for wheelchair tennis
 ITTF World Team Cup (ping pong), the nation-based team competition element of the Table Tennis World Cup
 FIE Team World Cup, the nation-based team competition element of the Fencing World Cup
 FIL Team World Cup, the nation-based team competition element of the Luge World Cup

See also
 World Cup (disambiguation), which includes lists team-based World Cups
 World Cup Trophy (disambiguation)